Union Castle is a British comedy television series which was originally broadcast on ITV in 1982.

Lord Mountainash, the left wing leader of a Trade Union, buys Runnymeade Castle as a base for his campaign against the Thatcher government. This meets with fierce opposition from the Conservative-supporting residents Wordsworth the butler and Lady Thaxted.

Main cast
 Stratford Johns as Lord Mountainash
 Moray Watson as Wordsworth
 Wanda Ventham as Ursula, Lady Thaxted
 Lyndon Hughes as Annie Evans
 Carol MacReady as Elizabeth Steel

References

Bibliography
 Palmer, Scott. British Film Actors' Credits, 1895-1987. McFarland, 1988.

External links
 

1982 British television series debuts
1982 British television series endings
1980s British comedy television series
ITV sitcoms
English-language television shows
Television shows produced by Granada Television